Curley "Boo" Johnson (born February 10, 1965) is an American basketball player, best known as a member of the Harlem Globetrotters.

Family 
Born in Peoria, Illinois, Curley Johnson is the son of Lorraine and Curley Johnson Sr (1936–1984). Curley Johnson Sr. was a bona fide pioneer of basketball and the "Jackie Robinson" of Bradley University basketball.

Early years 
Curley "Boo" Johnson moved to Peoria, Illinois, in 1970 at age 4. He led Sterling Grade School, coached by Robert Snowden, to a fourth-place finish in the city championships while setting scoring records, becoming the school's MVP. Johnson also excelled playing tailback in football for Sterling Lions JFL, leading them to an undefeated city championship.

He played football, basketball and baseball in high school at Peoria Richwoods for two years and then transferred to Peoria Central. In basketball, he helped lead Central to a 38–18 record and Regional and Sectional titles, and consecutive fourth-place finishes in the 1980 & 1981 Illinois State Classic Holiday Tournaments (now named the State Farm Holiday Classic).

College years 
Spoon River College 1982–83

Johnson scored 19 points in his first game against Richland College and led the state of Illinois and tied for seventh in the nation in field goal percentage shooting a torrid 65.7% record that still stands. SRC won the sectional title and set a school record for wins (26) and a 4th-place finish in the state. Johnson went 3 consecutive games without missing a field goal (21-21). He was named McDonald's Cage Classic All-tournament, All-Section, All-Region, and 4th team Sporting News NJCAA All-American. Johnson made the Dean's list and was elected to student senate and student representative to the college board of trustees as well as Homecoming King.

Muscatine Community College 1983-1984

Played one season for the MCC Indians

Loras College 1984–87

Johnson debuted at Loras, hitting a 20-foot fall-away jumper as time expired against archrival University of Dubuque, sending the game into overtime, giving Coach Mike Jaskulski his first college win. The "lightning quick" was known for his slick passing, unparalleled ball handling, and dribbling ability. Mike Jaskulski was quoted as saying that "Boo" was the finest ball handler and dribbler he ever coached or saw play at Loras – "The ball was always safe in his hands." Johnson did not just dribble through Dubuque, he earned a degree in marketing at Loras. Loras retired Johnson's #14 jersey on December 10, 1999.

Harlem Globetrotters 
Johnson was discovered by Globetrotters general manager, Joe Anzivino, and invited to training camp in Los Angeles in fall 1988 and immediately became the marquee dribbler and held that position for 18 consecutive seasons playing 4,210 games. He toured an amazing 81 countries in north, south and Central America, Asia, Europe, the Middle East and Africa.

Johnson is a world-famous Harlem Globetrotter who played 18 seasons from 1988 to 2007, performing his unbelievable style on all seven continents and 81 countries. Johnson inherited the role of dribbling wizard made famous by Marques Haynes and "Curly" Neal and became known as "The World's Greatest Dribbler". Johnson was a member of the team that participated in the enshrinement ceremony when the Globetrotters were inducted into the Naismith Basketball Hall of Fame in 2002. He was also part of the group that visited Pope John Paul II on November 29, 2000, in Rome. As a Globetrotter, Johnson also has had the privilege of meeting Mother Teresa and South African President, Nelson Mandela.

Awards 
 Peoria Area Sports Hall of Fame 2007
 Peoria African American Hall of Fame 2007
 Peoria High Sports Hall of Fame 2004
 Spoon River College Sports Hall of Fame 2010
 Loras College Jersey Number Retired 1999
 Harlem Globetrotters Team Captain Legacy Award 1996
 Mr. Globetrotter Award 1998, 1999
 Ambassador Award 1999

Personal 
Johnson lives in Scottsdale, Arizona, with his wife, Michelle, and stepson, Troy.

Retirement 
Since retirement from the Globetrotters, Johnson has been on the speaking circuit receiving standing ovations nationally. He has his own basketball academy and camp and trains some of the top names in the NBA. Recently, he portrayed a sports agent in the upcoming motion picture Midrange and will be featured in the motion picture Sweetwater, due for production in February 2011. Nationally recognized sports journalist Chet Coppock is writing a book about his life story. Johnson has been involved in many humanitarian causes such as the Boys and Girls Club, YMCA, Family Rescue, Big Brother Big Sister, The United Way, Special Olympics and Make A Wish Foundation.

Johnson has been featured on ABC's Wide World of Sports, ESPN Classics, Larry King Live, Regis and Kathy Lee, The Tonight Show with Jay Leno, Montel Williams and others.

References

External links
 Official Website

1965 births
Living people
Basketball players from Chicago
Harlem Globetrotters players
Junior college men's basketball players in the United States
Loras Duhawks men's basketball players
American men's basketball players